José Carlos Fernández González (born 24 January 1971) is a Bolivian retired football goalkeeper who is currently active as director of football of Bolivian club Bolívar.

Club career

Early career
Fernández developed his football skills at Tahuichi Academy, where he received a full scholarship to go to the United States and play while in college. After he finished school, he pursued a career as a professional goalkeeper.

International success at Cali
In his home country, Fernández played for important teams such as Oriente Petrolero, Blooming and Bolívar. He also went abroad to play for Córdoba CF in Spain, Jaguares and Veracruz in Mexico, New England Revolution in the MLS, Independiente Santa Fe and Deportivo Cali from Colombia.

Deportes Melipilla

Late career

International career
He has been capped for the Bolivia national team on 26 occasions, having participated in Copa América 1999 and 2004 among the most important tournaments he took part in. He represented his country in 9 FIFA World Cup qualification matches and at the 1999 Confederations Cup.

Honours

Club
Blooming
 Primera División (2): 1998, 1999

Bolívar
 Primera División (1): 2002
 Torneo de Apertura (1): 2009

Deportivo Cali
 Torneo Finalización (1): 2005

Oriente Petrolero
 Torneo de Clausura (1): 2010

References

External links

 

1971 births
Living people
Sportspeople from Santa Cruz de la Sierra
Bolivian footballers
Association football goalkeepers
Bolivia international footballers
1999 FIFA Confederations Cup players
1999 Copa América players
2004 Copa América players
FIU Panthers men's soccer players
Bolivian Primera División players
Categoría Primera A players
Oriente Petrolero players
Club Destroyers players
Club Blooming players
Córdoba CF players
Chiapas F.C. footballers
New England Revolution players
C.D. Veracruz footballers
Club Bolívar players
Independiente Santa Fe footballers
Deportivo Cali footballers
Universidad de Chile footballers
Universitario de Sucre footballers
Deportes Melipilla footballers
José Gálvez FBC footballers
Deportivo Italia players
Bolivian expatriate footballers
Expatriate footballers in Spain
Expatriate footballers in Mexico
Expatriate soccer players in the United States
Expatriate footballers in Colombia
Expatriate footballers in Chile
Expatriate footballers in Peru
Expatriate footballers in Venezuela
Bolivian expatriate sportspeople in Spain
Bolivian expatriate sportspeople in Mexico
Bolivian expatriate sportspeople in the United States
Bolivian expatriate sportspeople in Colombia
Bolivian expatriate sportspeople in Chile
Bolivian expatriate sportspeople in Peru
Bolivian expatriate sportspeople in Venezuela
Major League Soccer players